Patrick Jean Pouyanné (born 24 June 1963) is a French engineer who has been serving as chairman and CEO of TotalEnergies since 2014.

Early life and education
Pouyanné was born in Petit-Quevilly in the region of Seine-Maritime in France. He spent some of his youth in Bayonne, where his father was the director of regional customs. At 20, he entered the École Polytechnique where he graduated with an engineering degree, holding the 11th spot in the degree ranking. He then became an engineer of the Corps des mines.

Career

Career in the public sector
Pouyanné started his career in 1989 at the Ministry of Industry. In 1993, he became the technical advisor of Édouard Balladur, the French Prime Minister at the time. In 1995, he became technical advisor for environment and industry, and chief of staff of François Fillon right after at the Information Technology and Space Minister from 1995 to 1996.

Career in the private sector
In January 1997, Pouyanné joined the petroleum company Elf as general secretary for the Angolan subsidiary. Two years later, he was named at the management of the Qatari's exploration-production department.

In 2000 Total absorbed Elf and Pouyanné kept his position in this new French conglomerate that joined the ten most important petroleum groups in the world. In 2002 he became Total's senior vice president of the exploration production department in charge of the finance, economics and information systems and then in charge of strategy business development and R&D in 2006.

In May 2006 Pouyanné joined Total's management committee, and was named deputy general manager of the refining and chemistry department in 2011. He joined Total's executive committee and was named president of the refining chemicals department in 2012.

In October 2014, following the death of Christophe de Margerie, CEO of the group, it was decided to separate the functions of "president of the board of directors" and "executive director". Pouyanné was appointed CEO and president of the executive committee, while Thierry Desmarest, then honorary president, was recalled for the position of temporary president.

In May 2015, Pouyanné was elected as a member of the board of directors of Total. In December he was appointed chairman and CEO of Total, combining both roles.

At the 2018 World Economic Forum in Davos, Pouyanné attended a dinner of U.S. President Donald Trump with a group of European CEOs.

Other activities

Corporate boards
 Capgemini, Member of the Board of Directors (since 2017)

Non-profit organizations
 Polytechnic Institute of Paris, Member of the Board of Directors (since 2019)
 Brookings Institution, Member of the Board of Trustees
 European Round Table of Industrialists (ERT), Member

Recognition
Pouyanné was decorated as Knight of the Legion of Honour in September 2015.

Controversy
In 2021, Greenpeace and two other civil society groups filed a complaint with a Paris prosecutor against Pouyanné, alleging he abused his role on the board of École Polytechnique to allow Total to build a research and innovation center on the university's campus in Saclay.

References

External links

1963 births
Living people
École Polytechnique alumni
Corps des mines
Mines Paris - PSL alumni
French chief executives
People from Le Petit-Quevilly
Chevaliers of the Légion d'honneur
TotalEnergies people